David Woodcock is an English singer-songwriter and musician, currently based in his hometown of Southend-on-Sea.

He released his debut single "Same Things" in 2013 and his self-titled debut album in August 2014  on Blow Up Records. Record Collector editor Ian McCann said of David: "David Woodcock is a talent, in the classic Brit songwriter tradition. Every observation is honed to perfection" and BBC 6 Music DJ Steve Lamacq described David as "Part Stiff Records, part Brit Pop. A reckless Stephen Duffy or an Essex Jarvis Cocker".

His singles "Same Things", "Beggars Can't Be Choosers" and "Open Secret" have received national airplay on stations including BBC 6 Music and Xfm, and Woodcock also recorded a live session for Marc Riley on BBC 6 Music in August 2014. His most recent single, "Relatively Single Man", was the winner of BBC 6 Music's Rebel Playlist with 52% of the public vote.

Live, Woodcock performs both solo or with a band with a fluid line up of musicians, some of whom also appear on his album.

His partner, Wendy Solomon, fronts her own band Angel and the Melodyhorns who have released one album Exposure.  She also appears as "Jem Lea", bassist with all-female Slade tribute band Slady (fronted by The Featherz' lead singer/guitarist Danie Centric as "Gobby Holder".)  Woodcock has played guitar with the Melodyhorns and occasionally guests on keyboards with Slady, with whom he is billed as "Our Friend Stan."

References

External links
 
 David Woodcock Biography & Discography

Year of birth missing (living people)
Living people
Musicians from Essex
English male singer-songwriters
People from Southend-on-Sea